This is a cities of South Korea by population including provincial-level divisions: special city (특별시/特別市) and metropolitan cities (광역시/廣域市), and municipal-level division: cities (시/市). Other municipal-level divisions: counties (군/郡 which have populations under 50K) and districts (구/區) are not included. All population data are based on the South Korean population and housing census 2000–2020.

Gallery

See also
 Administrative divisions of South Korea
 List of cities in South Korea
 List of largest cities
 List of South Korean regions by GDP

References

External links
 Korean Statistical Information Service 

Population
Korea, South